Wise County is a county in the U.S. state of Texas. As of the 2020 census, its population was 68,632. Its county seat is Decatur. Wise County is part of the Dallas–Fort Worth–Arlington metropolitan statistical area. Its Wise Eyes crime-watch program, eventually adopted by mostly rural counties in several states, was started in 1993 by then-Sheriff Phil Ryan.

History
On November 10, 1837, the Battle of the Knobs was fought in what is now Wise County between about 150 Native American warriors and 18 Republic of Texas soldiers under Lieutenant A. B. Benthuysen. Despite being heavily outnumbered, the Texan soldiers held their ground, killing or wounding an estimated 50 Native Americans and losing 10 of their own men. More settlers began coming into the area not long afterward, with people relocating from both the Upper South and Deep South. Wise County was not founded until 1856. It was named after Virginia Congressman Henry A. Wise, who had supported annexation of Texas by the United States. He was elected governor of Virginia in 1856.

As few residents of Wise County were slaveholders, opinions were mixed at the time of the Civil War, and many people opposed secession. Unionists were persecuted in North Texas, and some were lynched. Forty-two men were murdered in the Great Hanging at Gainesville in October 1862, over the course of several days in neighboring Cooke County. This was one of the worst examples of vigilante justice in American history.

In recent years, Wise County allowed an increase in hydraulic fracturing. In 2011, the Parr family and others filed a lawsuit against several energy companies, including Republic Energy, Inc. and Ryder Scott Petroleum, claiming the extracting processes have created health complications for their family and neighbors. In April 2014, the Parrs won a $2.9 million award from a Dallas jury.

Geography

Adjacent counties
 Montague County (north)
 Cooke County (northeast)
 Denton County (east)
 Tarrant County (southeast)
 Parker County (south)
 Jack County (west)

National protected area
 Lyndon B. Johnson National Grassland (majority)

Communities

Cities

 Aurora
 Bridgeport
 Decatur (county seat)
 Fort Worth (mostly in Tarrant County with small parts in Denton, Johnson, Parker and Wise Counties)
 Lake Bridgeport
 New Fairview
 Newark (small part in Tarrant County)
 Paradise
 Rhome
 Runaway Bay

Towns
 Alvord
 Boyd
 Chico
 Crafton

Census-designated places
 Briar (partly in Tarrant and Parker Counties)
 Pecan Acres (mostly in Tarrant County)

Unincorporated communities
 Balsora
 Boonsville
 Cottondale
 Greenwood
 Slidell

Demographics

Note: the US Census treats Hispanic/Latino as an ethnic category. This table excludes Latinos from the racial categories and assigns them to a separate category. Hispanics/Latinos can be of any race.

In 2000 there were 48,793 people, 17,178 households, and 13,467 families were residing in the county. The population density was 54 people per square mile (21/km2). The 19,242 housing units averaged 21 per mi2 (8/km2). The racial makeup of the county was 91.01% White, 1.23% Black, 0.75% Native American, 0.22% Asian, 5.07% from other races, and 1.71% from two or more races. About 10.76% of the population was Hispanic or Latino of any race. By 2020, its population increased to 68,632; the racial and ethnic makeup of the county in 2020 was predominantly non-Hispanic white, and Hispanic or Latino American of any race.

A Williams Institute analysis of 2010 census data found about 3.4 same-sex couples per 1,000 households in the county.

Politics
Wise County, like most rural counties in Texas, votes reliably for Republican candidates in statewide and national elections.

Education
These school districts lie entirely within Wise County:
 Alvord Independent School District
 Boyd Independent School District
 Bridgeport Independent School District
 Chico Independent School District
 Decatur Independent School District
 Paradise Independent School District
 Slidell Independent School District

This private educational institution serves Wise County:
 Victory Christian Academy

This higher education institution serves Wise County:
 Weatherford College

Transportation

Major highways
  U.S. Highway 81
  U.S. Highway 287
  U.S. Highway 380
  State Highway 101
  State Highway 114
  State Highway 199

Airports
These public-use airports are located in the county:
 Bishop Airport (76T)
 Bridgeport Municipal Airport (XBP)
 Decatur Municipal Airport (LUD)
 Heritage Creek Airstrip (58T)
 Rhome Meadows Airport (T76)

See also

 List of museums in North Texas
 National Register of Historic Places listings in Wise County, Texas
 Recorded Texas Historic Landmarks in Wise County

References

External links

 Wise County Genealogy Resources
 Wise County on the Web
 Wise County government's website
 "Liberally Lean From The Land of Dairy Queen" - A Local Blog About Wise County
 Wise County in Handbook of Texas Online at the University of Texas

 
1856 establishments in Texas
Dallas–Fort Worth metroplex
Populated places established in 1856